Irina Volodymyrovna Tsvila (29 April 1969 – 25 February 2022) was a Ukrainian teacher, public activist and photographer, who participated in the Russo-Ukrainian War and was killed during the Battle of Kyiv.

Biography 
After receiving pedagogical education, she worked at the Kiev International School "Meridian" until 2006.

In 2014, she volunteered during the War in Donbas for the Sich Battalion. She later served for the Ukrainian Army's National Response Guard Brigade. During the Dignity Revolution and the Russo-Ukrainian War, she devoted herself to photography, holding a personal exhibition in the village of Svyatopetrovsky in 2017. She was also involved in writing, participating in the publication of the book Voices of War. Stories of Veterans.

Works 
 Voices of War. Stories of veterans

Personal life 
Tsvila was killed on 25 February 2022, during the Battle of Kyiv, during an armored assault by Russian troops. Her husband also died during the Battle of Kyiv.

References

Bibliography 
 Подобна, Є. Дівчата зрізають коси. Книга спогадів. — К.І.С, 2020. — 346 с. — ISBN 978-617-7420-39-1.
 Чабарай, Г. Ірина Цвіла: «Можливо, я розридаюся, коли настане перемога, а доти не час киснути» // Тиждень. — 2017. — 14 вересня.
 Максименко, О. «Цвісти за будь-яких обставин» — війна і повернення Ірини Цвілої // Без броні. — 2020. — 20 січня.
 Бурлакова, В. Ірина Цвіла, позивний Лінза: «Для всіх, хто пройшов війну, це загальна біда — повернутися у „цивілізоване“ життя. Бо де воно цивілізованіше — ще питання» // Цензор. — 2021. — 5 жовтня.

1969 births
2022 deaths
People from Kyiv Oblast
Ukrainian women writers
Ukrainian women educators
Ukrainian photographers
Ukrainian women photographers
Ukrainian female military personnel
Ukrainian military personnel killed in the 2022 Russian invasion of Ukraine
Ukrainian schoolteachers